
This is a list of unmade and unreleased animated projects by Universal Pictures. Some of these projects were, or still are, in development limbo. These also include the co-productions the studio collaborated with in the past (i.e. Amblimation, Walter Lantz Productions, Universal Animation Studios, Illumination Entertainment, and DreamWorks Animation) as well as sequels to their franchises.

1940s

1941

1990s

1991

1993

1995

1996

1997

1998

1999

2000s

2001

2002

2005

2006

2007

2008

2009

2010s

2010

2011

2012

2013

2015

2017

2018

See also
 List of unproduced DreamWorks Animation projects

References

Universal Pictures
Universal Pictures animated films
Universal Pictures
Unreleased Universal Pictures